The 1899 Irish local elections were the first local elections following the reorganisation of Irish local government caused by the Local Government (Ireland) Act 1898. The 1898 Act had changed the nature of Irish local governance, replacing the unrepresentative grand jury system, and making local government more democratic and representative. As a result, the 1899 election saw the traditional Unionist Landowning class, which had previously dominated much of Irish local politics, being replaced by a newer nationalist representation. Ulster's local government, however, remained Unionist in political outlook.

The elections also saw the expansion of Labour representation. In the 1898 elections, only Ulster had Unionist and unaligned Labourite Councillors. Following the election however the overall Labour representation increased to 303. Of these 303, 218 were nationalists (affiliated to an IPP faction), whilst 56 were extremist (with links to the IRB). There were 14 Unionist Labourites in Ulster, 4 in Munster, 2 in Leinster, 1 in Connaught, but none in Dublin.

They were held in two stages:
Urban area local elections in January 1899
Rural areas in March 1899

Detailed results

County Councils

Borough Councils

District Councils

References

 
1899 elections in Europe
1899 in Irish politics
Politics of Ireland (1801–1923)
January 1899 events
March 1899 events
1899 elections in Ireland